Rock Creek is a  tributary of the Kankakee River in the U.S. state of Illinois. It empties into the Kankakee River in Kankakee River State Park, northwest of Kankakee, Illinois. It starts in higher land and then drops into the Kankakee River Valley. Because of this, the river has cut through the rock, forming a gorge, most of which is in the state park. A trail in the park follows the creek.

The stream is a very popular smallmouth bass fishing destination for many northern and central area Illinois residents. Twice per year, the Illinois DNR stocks trout in the creek as well, creating an opportunity for spin or fly fishing.

Other streams
The U.S. Geographic Names Information System (GNIS) shows 12 streams named Rock Creek in the state of Illinois.

References

Kenneth J. Schoon, Calumet Beginnings, 2003

Rivers of Illinois
Rivers of Kankakee County, Illinois